Canastra is a genus of bunchgrass plants in the grass family.  Its species are endemic to Brazil.

Species
Species include:
 Canastra aristella (Döll) Zuloaga & Morrone — Minas Gerais, Paraná, Rio de Janeiro, Rio Grande do Sul, Santa Catarina, São Paulo states.
 Canastra lanceolata (Filg.) Morrone, Zuloaga, Davidse & Filg. — Minas Gerais state.

See also
 List of Poaceae genera

References

Panicoideae
Poaceae genera
Bunchgrasses of South America
Endemic flora of Brazil
Grasses of Brazil
Flora of Minas Gerais